Rockingham (also Sallie) is an unincorporated community and census-designated place in central Bacon County, Georgia, United States. It lies along State Route 32 to the east of the city of Alma, the county seat of Bacon County. As of the 2010 census it had a population of 248.

Demographics

History
A post office called Rockingham was established in 1902, and remained in operation until 1939. The community was named after Rockingham, North Carolina, the native home of a share of the first settlers.

References

Census-designated places in Bacon County, Georgia
Census-designated places in Georgia (U.S. state)
Unincorporated communities in Bacon County, Georgia
Unincorporated communities in Georgia (U.S. state)